Escuela Agrícola San Vicente de Paul is a high school located in Coltauco, Cachapoal Province, Chile.

It was founded in Tobalaba, Santiago, Santiago Metropolitan Region in 1935, and on 1 May 1943 it began working at Coltauco.

References 

Educational institutions established in 1935
Secondary schools in Chile
Schools in Cachapoal Province
1935 establishments in Chile